The Adventures of Captain Africa is a 1955 adventure serial film directed by Spencer Gordon Bennet and starring John Hart.

Plot
Trapper Nat Coleman and government agent Ted Arnold come upon a plot to take over an African nation.  Its leader, Caliph Abdul el Hamid, has been exiled from his country and replaced by a look-alike usurper allied with an unnamed foreign power.  The Caliph intends to return but enemy agents Boris and Greg are out to stop him. Captain Africa a masked jungle lord, appears occasionally to aid Nat and Ted.

Cast
John Hart as Captain Africa
Rick Vallin as Ted
Ben Welden as Omar
June Howard as Princess Rhoda
Bud Osborne as Nat Coleman
Paul Marion as Hamid
Lee Roberts as Boris

Production
The Adventures of Captain Africa was conceived and filmed as a sequel to The Phantom (starring Tom Tyler). Well into production, Columbia found that its screen rights to the comic strip had expired. King Features wanted more money than producer Sam Katzman was willing to spend, and negotiations broke down.

Katzman ordered a rewrite, and new scenes showed John Hart now wearing an amended costume that only used part of the original Phantom outfit, with the addition of a leather aviator's cap and riding breeches. The revised story featured a new hero, Captain Africa, who still bears a strong resemblance to the Phantom in both appearance and behavior.

The Adventures of Captain Africa consists mostly of stock footage from earlier serials Jungle Menace (1937), The Desert Hawk (1944), and The Phantom (1943) itself. Footage from The Phantom was reduced when this stopped being a sequel. Each of the 15 chapters uses only a few minutes of new material.

Producer Katzman was well known for his thrift and shortcuts. Serial producers often economized by including a "cheater" chapter, in which flashbacks to earlier chapters are shown instead of new scenes. The Adventures of Captain Africa uses four cheaters among its 15 chapters. The frequent recaps were possibly necessitated by the hasty rewrites during production.

The Adventures of Captain Africa was Columbia's last jungle serial.

Release
The serial was released on VHS, and on DVD from a company called Serial Bowl, which specialized in movie serials.

Critical reception
Serial historian William C. Cline writes that The Adventures of Captain Africa is "an obvious remake of The Phantom, it contained many stock shots from the earlier release and at times seemed almost like a repeat run."

Chapter titles
Mystery Man of the Jungle!
Captain Africa to the Rescue!
Midnight Attack!
Into the Crocodile Pit!
Jungle War Drums!
Slave Traders!
Saved by Captain Africa!
The Bridge in the Sky! -- Re-Cap Chapter
Blasted by Captain Africa! -- Re-Cap Chapter
The Vanishing Princess!
The Tunnel of Terror! -- Re-Cap Chapter
Fangs of the Beast!
Renegades at Bay! -- Re-Cap Chapter
Captain Africa and the Wolf Dog!
Captain Africa's Final Move!
Source:

See also
List of American films of 1955

References

External links

1955 films
1950s English-language films
1955 adventure films
American black-and-white films
Columbia Pictures film serials
Films directed by Spencer Gordon Bennet
American adventure films
Films with screenplays by George H. Plympton
1950s American films